Galo Galecio Taranto (June 1, 1906 in Vinces – April 14, 1993 in  Quito) was an Ecuadorian  painter, sculptor, caricaturist, and printmaker.

He studied at the School of Fine Arts in Guayaquil, and received a scholarship to study printmaking and mural painting at the National Academy of Fine Arts in Mexico from 1944 to 1946. In Mexico he studied with famous muralist Diego Rivera, and became a member of the printmaking workshop Taller de Gráfica Popular. He then created his first print portfolio Bajo la Linea del Ecuador, one of his most important works.

In 1987 Galo Galecio was awarded Ecuador's most prestigious prize "Premio Eugenio Espejo" for his lifetime work as an artist.

Notes 

1906 births
1993 deaths
20th-century Ecuadorian painters